Demi Korevaar (born 9 August 2000 in Breda) is a Dutch volleyball player, who plays as a Middle blocker. She is a member of the Women's National Team.

Career 
She participated in the 2018 FIVB Volleyball Women's World Championship, and 2018 FIVB Volleyball Women's Nations League.
She plays for Talent Team Papendal.

References

External links 
 FIVB profile
 CEV profile

2000 births
Living people
Dutch women's volleyball players
Middle blockers
Sportspeople from Breda